Đồng Nai is a province in the Southeast region of Vietnam, located east and northeast of Ho Chi Minh City (Saigon). The capital city and the largest city in Đồng Nai is Biên Hòa.

Geography
Đồng Nai is in southeastern Vietnam and bordered by: Bình Thuận, Lâm Đồng, Bình Dương and Bình Phước, Bà Rịa–Vũng Tàu, and Ho Chi Minh City (Saigon). Đồng Nai has an advanced traffic system with many backbone national roads crossing it, such as: National Route 1A, National Route 20, National Route 51 and the North–South railway lines; located adjacent to the Saigon Port and Tan Son Nhat International Airport, it offers many advantages to economic activities in the area. Its location is very important for the development of the Southern economic main hub and a junction of the South Eastern and Tây Nguyên Highland.

Đồng Nai is based essentially on the system of lakes, dams and rivers, of which Trị An Lake with an area of 323 km² and over 60 rivers, rivulets and canals are very favorable for the development of a number of aquatic products: raft bred fish and shrimp. The seasonal tropical forests are protected in Cát Tiên National Park, located in the north of Đồng Nai and the adjacent Vĩnh Cửu Nature Reserve; the former has been recognized internationally as a significant biosphere reserve. From the mountainous area, Đồng Nai River, Vietnam's largest internal waterway, flows southeast through Biên Hòa City, Ho Chi Minh City, and villages along its way. This river plays an important role in supplying fresh water for the whole area.

Climate
Đồng Nai lies in the monsoon tropical zone and is affected by the north-east and south-west monsoon. It is also under the influence of the Pacific Ocean tropical atmosphere between April and October. The climate is divided into two distinct seasons: the rainy season lasts from March or April to November and the dry season from December to March or April of the following year. The average temperature is between 23.9 and 29.0 °C, much lower than the standard level of tropical regions (26-30 °C). Its annual rainfall is quite high with 1,500 - 2,700 mm.

On average, the weather is sunny for 4.0-9.5 hours a day and does not exceed 11.5 hours per day, even on the hottest and sunniest days. Total rainy days within a year are between 120 and 170 days (the standard level of tropical regions is 150–160 days) with a total rainfall of some 1,500 - 2,750 mm. The average humidity is around 80 - 82% and humidity in the dry season is 10-12%, lower than that of the rainy season; humidity varies considerably between areas.

Đồng Nai's weather with regular sunshine, rain, and high humidity, equally found in the localities, facilitates agricultural production and development of industrial, cultural and tourist activities.

Resources
Đồng Nai is plentiful with resources such as forests, granite mines, construction stone, clay, kaolin, pozzolan, sand and gravel.

Demographics
Đồng Nai is one of Vietnam's most populous provinces (ranked fifth) with a population of 2,838,600 in 2014. Its population has been growing rapidly in recent years, mainly driven by migrant workers coming to the province to work in factories. Population growth was 1.95% in 2005, between 2.5% from 2008 to 2010 and 3.5% in 2011. Net migration contributed 2.2% to this figure. Đồng Nai is second only to Bình Dương province in both population growth and net migration.

The population of Đồng Nai is primarily the dominant Kinh (Viet) ethnicity, although there are residents of the Chinese, Stieng, Mạ, Nùng, Tay, and Cham minorities.

Transportation
Đồng Nai has made significant progress in upgrading its transport infrastructure, especially roads. National highways in the province have a total length of 244.5 km and have been improved and widened up to level 1 and 2 standards (National Highway No. 5 and 6) or up to third grade like National Highway No. 20 to Đà Lạt. The total roads system in the province is 3,339 kilometers long, of which almost 700 kilometers are tar roads. All communes and wards are connected to the road network.

Under scheme in the near future, highways to Bà Rịa–Vũng Tàu province and Ho Chi Minh City, a railway connecting Biên Hòa to Vũng Tàu, upgrading provincial road No. 726 and connecting National Highway No. 20 and No. 1 with National Highway No. 51 will create a complete system, promoting socioeconomic development in the province and region.

A new airport, Long Thành International Airport, is planned for construction in Long Thành district, Đồng Nai, approximately 40 km northeast of Ho Chi Minh City. Upon completion, it will handle international flights in place of Tan Son Nhat International Airport, which will serve domestic flights.

Administrative divisions

Đồng Nai is subdivided into 11 district-level sub-divisions:

 9 districts:
 Cẩm Mỹ
 Định Quán
 Long Thành
 Nhơn Trạch
 Tân Phú
 Thống Nhất
 Trảng Bom
 Vĩnh Cửu
 Xuân Lộc
 2 provincial cities:
 Biên Hòa (capital)
 Long Khánh

They are further subdivided into eight commune-level towns (or townlets), 122 communes, and 40 wards.

Economy
Đồng Nai is one of Vietnam's main manufacturing centers and one of the most developed provinces.

Agriculture
Despite its strong focus on industrial development, Đồng Nai still has a substantial agricultural sector. Agricultural land accounts for 47% of the province's area as of 2011, a total of 277,600 ha. This is lower than in other provinces in the Southeast region, except for Ho Chi Minh City. Cereals were grown on 118,600 ha in 2011, an area that has been decreasing gradually in recent years, from 139,300 ha in 2005. The output of rice has, however, remained stable and was at 335,200t in 2011. The province also produced 305,300t of maize, making it the largest producer of maize outside the country's mountainous regions and contributing 6.3% to the national maize output. Đồng Nai also produced 619,700t of sugar cane (3.5% of the national output), sweet potatoes and cassava.

Đồng Nai is the largest livestock producer among Vietnam's provinces and there are plans to further invest in the sector.  The government reserved 15,000 ha for livestock farming in 2012, mostly for poultry and pigs.
In 2011 there were 1.33 million pigs and 10.655 million poultry. Despite not being located along the coast, Đồng Nai produced 41,600t of fishery products in 2011. Over 90% of this was produced in 33,500 ha of aquaculture farms. This makes Đồng Nai the largest aquaculture producer outside the Mekong Delta.

Industry
Đồng Nai is one of Vietnam's main manufacturing centers. It has attracted 9.1% of FDI into Vietnam by 2011, an accumulated US$18.2 billion, the fourth largest after Ho Chi Minh City, Bà Rịa–Vũng Tàu province and Hanoi. Industrial gross output in 2011 was VND 314 trillion, 10.6% of the national value. It has received a broad range of FDI projects, including a Bosch auto component plant, a Toshiba motor plant, a PepsiCo beverage factory, a Posco steel plant, and a Nestlé coffee factory.

Ecology
A large part of Đồng Nai Biosphere Reserve, include Nam Cát Tiên, is located in Dong Nai province.

Tri An Dam, besides providing electricity, it also helps to regulate floods and ensure drinking water for people in the area.

As a result of the Viet Nam war, some areas around Bien Hoa Air Base were dioxin pollution. The authorities are trying to clean up these areas.

As defined by a 2008 World Bank survey, the province is one of the five most-polluted in Vietnam.

Education
Dong Nai University
Lạc Hồng University
Lương Thế Vinh High School for the Gifted
Ngo Quyen High School is founded in 1956.

References

External links

 Đồng Nai Provincial People's Council & People's Committee
 Đồng Nai Provincial People's Council & People's Committee 
 Đồng Nai Industrial Service, a provincial department of the Ministry of Industry

 
Southeast (Vietnam)
Provinces of Vietnam